The 1973 Pot Black was a professional invitational snooker tournament, which was broadcast in 1973. The tournament was held in the Pebble Mill Studios in Birmingham, and featured eight professional players. All matches were one-frame shoot-outs.

Broadcasts were on BBC2 and started at 21:00 on Tuesday 13 February 1973 The tournament this year was reverted to 8 players. The three ex-winners were in a Pot Black Champions group while the remaining five players were in a League of Champions group. The top two from each group qualified for the semi-finals. Alan Weeks presented the programme with Ted Lowe as commentator and Sydney Lee as referee.

The tournament featured the TV debut of Alex Higgins who beat John Pulman in the first match of the series. Eddie Charlton retained the Pot Black title beating Rex Williams 93–33 shown on 29 May  and also made the first century break making 110 against John Spencer which remained a record until 2005.

Main draw

League of Champions Group

Pot Black Champions Group

Knockout stage

References

Pot Black
1973 in snooker
1973 in English sport